Jeep-Eagle was the name of the automobile sales division created by the Chrysler Corporation after the US$2 billion takeover of American Motors Corporation (AMC) in 1987. The division marketed a variety of vehicles until 1997.

History 
The Jeep-Eagle Division consisted mostly of what was left of American Motors after its acquisition by Chrysler. The first group vice president was Joseph Cappy, who previously held the post of AMC president and chief executive officer. 

The new organization was responsible for continuing the promotion, sales, and product engineering for Jeep and the remaining AMC vehicles, most notably the AMC Eagle. It was a method to absorb nearly 1,200 American Motors dealers into Chrysler's distribution system and have them "meet stronger quality standards". The new division gave Chrysler three dealer organizations because state franchise laws prevented Chrysler from merging the AMC dealer network into its existing Chrysler-Plymouth or Dodge franchise systems, as well as preventing the sale of existing Chrysler products through AMC dealers. 

Upon completion of the merger, Chrysler rebranded the Renault Medallion under the Eagle marque and discontinued the Renault Alliance, Encore, and GTA models. AMC's dealers continued to market and service the popular Jeep light-truck brand. They also were responsible for selling the new Eagle Premier, which Renault and AMC had been working on since 1982 and were originally planning on releasing in 1987 before the merger.

The newly established Jeep-Eagle Division business strategy was to increase Jeep production and focus more money on marketing. The new "Eagle marketing umbrella" also marketed versions of vehicles produced by Diamond-Star Motors.

Chrysler hoped to make Jeep-Eagle their "specialty division," selling products distinctly different from the K-car-based products. The Eagle passenger cars were supposed to try to capture import buyers. However, they evolved from the innovative, full-sized Premier and the imported mid-sized Medallion into a hodgepodge of cars developed between Chrysler and Mitsubishi. Eventually, many Eagle-branded automobiles were duplicated at Dodge and Chrysler-Plymouth dealerships. Chrysler made a good-faith effort to give the Eagle brand an identity by offering an all wheel drive (AWD) Eagle Talon, basically a badge engineered Mitsubishi Eclipse AWD, however sales were hindered by marketing missteps.

The Jeep half of the division, however, remained the better-known and more popular brand. Chrysler latched on to the Jeep heritage and advertisements featured Lee Iacocca assured that after Chrysler took over AMC, that "we won't fool around with an American institution. Jeep will stay Jeep. That's a promise." Many of the long-established AMC/Jeep dealers considered the new Eagle line of passenger cars to be less profitable than their Jeep business. American Motors had phased out domestic-built rear-wheel-drive passenger cars after 1983 and their captive front-wheel-drive imports did not achieve sales successes. Thus, AMC/Jeep dealer sales and service expertise was focused on the four-wheel drive Jeeps and AMC's Eagle AWD models.

The objective of the Eagle Division was to target consumers that "are young, independent-minded, educated and affluent-baby boomers and their younger brothers and sisters, Generation X." However, Eagle customers purchased similar Dodge, Plymouth, or Chrysler vehicles; thus, according to the automaker, the decline in Eagle models no longer justified the investment required to maintaining the brand. Although Chrysler had planned to redesign the Eagle Vision for 1999, production continued only into September 1997. The model was later marketed as the Chrysler 300M as the decision to drop the Eagle brand was already made.

Jeep became a stand-alone division when the Eagle brand was retired shortly after Chrysler's merger with Daimler-Benz in 1998, and efforts were made to merge the Chrysler and Jeep brands as one sales unit. Dealers with only the Chrysler franchise did not have a sport utility vehicle (SUV) to sell. Incorporating the Jeep line allowed them to compete in this popular market segment. While adding Jeep vehicles to Chrysler cars helped individual dealerships, it also eliminated the need to continue the Eagle brand.

References 

Jeep
American Motors
Chrysler